Stoney Creek Township, Indiana may refer to one of the following places:

 Stoney Creek Township, Henry County, Indiana
 Stoney Creek Township, Randolph County, Indiana

See also

Stoney Creek Township (disambiguation)

Indiana township disambiguation pages